Non-Partisan National Women's Christian Temperance Union was an American temperance association organized at Cleveland, Ohio, January 22, 1890, as a protest against the attitude of the Woman's Christian Temperance Union (W.C.T.U.) toward political parties.

History
The organization was formed by women who objected to political action taken by the W.C.T.U., an objection which already had caused some secession from that body. Ohio organized a non-partisan union in 1886, and there were various other non-partisan bodies subsequently formed. When the Non-Partisan National Woman's Christian Temperance Union was organized, Pennsylvania had already followed Ohio's example, and was represented in the new movement by a State union.

The first annual convention was held at Alleghany City, Pennsylvania, in November 1890, subsequent to a call on October 28, 1890, for a National convention of the Non-Partisan National Woman's Christian Temperance Union:—

Other State unions formed in at least 14 States and there was a district union in the District of Columbia. The work of this organization was almost wholly educational, its efforts being to reach every class of the population, child, youth, and adult, with proven facts regarding the drink habit and traffic. 

The Seventh Annual Convention was held in Washington, D.C., December 1897.

At the Eighth Annual Convention of the Non-Partisan National Women's Christian Temperance Union, held in Columbus, Ohio, January 1898, the officers elected were: President, Annie Turner Wittenmyer; vice-president, Mrs. T. B. Walker; corresponding secretary, Ellen J. Phinney; recording secretary, Etta B. Hurford; treasurer, Mrs. H. M. Ingham. In the same year, a new organization was formed at Cleveland, the Educational Temperance Confederation. In addition to the Non-Partisan National Women's Christian Temperance Union, it included the International Organisation of Good Templars, the W.C.T.U., the Catholic Total Abstinence Union of America, the Royal Templars of Temperance, and the Anti-Saloon League. Its object was to make known the hygienic effects of alcohol, by means of illustrated lectures. The work was carried on by an Executive Committee composed of two members from each of the affiliated organizations.

In 1903, the officers of the union were: President, vacant; vice-president, Mrs. E. B. Harford; general secretary, Ellen J. Phinney; treasurer, Clara Rankin Coblentz; recording secretary, Emma A. Fowler; evangelist and organizer, Isabel Plumb. The organizations efforts were directed through several departments, each having its secretary, which in 1903 were: educational, Susanna F. Savery; legislative, Lydia H. Tilton; Sunday-school work, Mrs. H. S. Ellis; rescue work, Agnes C. Paul; industrial training; army, navy and marine corps work, Rachel C. Levy; young people's work, Clara Rankin Coblentz; evangelistic, Eliza A. Potter; and editor, Temperance Tribune, Laura Rosamond White.

References

 
Temperance organizations in the United States
Conservative organizations in the United States
1890 establishments in Ohio
History of women in the United States
Women's organizations based in the United States
Christian women's organizations
Organizations established in 1890
Christianity and society in the United States
Christian temperance movement